The regular season of the 2020–21 NBL season, the 43rd season of the National Basketball League (Australia), started in mid-January, with nine teams participating.

Games

Round 1

Round 2

Round 3

Round 4

Round 5

NBL Cup

Round 6

Round 7

Round 8

Round 9

Round 10

Round 11

Round 12

Round 13

Round 14

Round 15

Round 16
On 15 April 2021, the NBL announced that Round 16 would be the league's heritage round, with each team wearing their own heritage jersey.

Round 17

Round 18

Round 19

Round 20

On 18 May 2021, Round 20 was announced as the league's annual Indigenous Round with each team wearing jersey's featuring indigenous artwork inspired by their local area.

Round 21

Ladder

References

External links

 

regular season
2020–21 in Australian basketball